Utina may refer to:

a Timucua chiefdom in northern Florida during the 16th century, see Agua Dulce people
Northern Utina, another Timucua tribe, also referred to as the Utina
, a U.S. Navy ship
Firman Utina (born 1981), Indonesian football player

See also
Utin (disambiguation)